Rémi Maréval (born 24 February 1983) is a Martiniquais former professional footballer who played as a defender.

Career
Born in Domont, Maréval began his career at the age of 14 in the US Chantilly's youth system and signed for Ligue 2 team AS Beauvais in the summer of 2001. After two and a half years with AS Beauvais, where he played 38 games and scored one goal, Maréval signed for Oldham Athletic in January 2004. In 2004, after half a year in England with Oldham Athletic, he returned to France and signed for Gazélec Ajaccio. After a successful season with 37 games and one goal for Gazélec Ajaccio, he joined Tours, but played only 33 matches in two seasons. In July 2007, Maréval again moved, this time to FC Nantes.

On 2 February 2014, Israel Premier League club Maccabi Tel Aviv announced Maréval's arrival in a contract until the end of the 2013–14 season.

Trivia
Maréval had one of his most memorable moments against Olympique de Marseille, scoring a goal from more than 30 metres. He scored another memorable goal against Nîmes Olympique from 60 metres in September 2009. Coming after just eight seconds, the goal was the fastest goal in the history of the French Ligue 2.

References

External links
 
 
 

1983 births
Living people
People from Domont
French people of Martiniquais descent
French footballers
Martiniquais footballers
Footballers from Val-d'Oise
Association football defenders
Martinique international footballers
Ligue 1 players
Ligue 2 players
Belgian Pro League players
Israeli Premier League players
Nemzeti Bajnokság I players
AS Beauvais Oise players
Gazélec Ajaccio players
Tours FC players
FC Nantes players
Oldham Athletic A.F.C. players
S.V. Zulte Waregem players
K.A.A. Gent players
Maccabi Tel Aviv F.C. players
Fehérvár FC players
2014 Caribbean Cup players
French expatriate footballers
Martiniquais expatriate footballers
French expatriate sportspeople in England
Expatriate footballers in England
French expatriate sportspeople in Belgium
Expatriate footballers in Belgium
Martiniquais expatriate sportspeople in Israel
Expatriate footballers in Israel
Martiniquais expatriate sportspeople in Hungary
Expatriate footballers in Hungary